Ada or Ardor: A Family Chronicle is a novel by Vladimir Nabokov published in 1969.

Ada began to materialize in 1959, when Nabokov was flirting with two projects, "The Texture of Time" and "Letters from Terra." In 1965, he began to see a link between the two ideas, finally composing a unified novel from February 1966 to October 1968. The published cumulation would become his longest work.  Ada was initially given a mixed reception. However, writing in The New York Times Book Review, noted scholar Alfred Appel called it "a great work of art, a necessary book, radiant and rapturous," and said that it "provides further evidence that he is a peer of Kafka, Proust and Joyce."

Title
According to David Eagleman, Nabokov named the title character in part after his favorite butterfly. An avid (and professional) collector of butterflies, Nabokov especially liked a particular species with yellow wings and a black body. As a synesthete, he associated colors with each letter; A with yellow, and D with black. Thus he saw a reflection of his favorite butterfly (yellow-black-yellow) in the name "Ada."  His character, Ada, wanted to be a lepidopterist.

"Ada" is also a pun, a homophone, for "Ardor." Marina, Ada's mother, pronounces her name with "long, deep" Russian "A"s, which is how a speaker of non-rhotic English would say the word "Ardor."

Plot summary
Ada tells the life story of a man named Van Veen, and his lifelong love affair with his sister Ada. They meet when she is eleven (soon to be twelve) and he is fourteen, believing that they are cousins (more precisely: that their fathers are cousins and that their mothers are sisters), and begin a sexual affair. They later discover that Van's father is also Ada's and her mother is also his. The story follows the various interruptions and resumptions of their affair. Both are wealthy, educated, and intelligent. The book itself takes the form of his memoir, written when he is in his nineties, punctuated with his own and Ada's marginalia, and in parts with notes by an unnamed editor, suggesting the manuscript is not complete.

The novel is divided into five parts. As they progress chronologically, this structure evokes a sense of a person reflecting on his own memories, with an adolescence stretching out epically, and many later years simply flashing by.

Setting
The story takes place in the late nineteenth century on what appears to be an alternative history of Earth, which is called Demonia or Antiterra. Antiterra has the same geography and a largely similar history to that of Earth; however, it is crucially different at various points. For example, the United States includes all of the Americas (which were discovered by African navigators). But it was also settled extensively by Russians, so that what we know as western Canada is a Russian-speaking province called "Estoty", and eastern Canada a French-speaking province called "Canady". Russian, English, and French are all in use in North America. The territory which belongs to Russia in our world, and much of Asia, is part of an empire called Tartary, while the word "Russia" is simply a "quaint synonym" for Estoty. The British Empire, which includes most or all of Europe and Africa, is ruled (in the nineteenth century) by a King Victor. A city named Manhattan takes the place of our universe's New York City.  Aristocracy is still widespread, but some technology has advanced well into twentieth-century forms. Electricity, however, has been banned since almost the time of its discovery following an event referred to as "the L-disaster". Airplanes and cars exist, but television and telephones do not; their functions are served by similar devices powered by water. The setting is thus a complex mixture of Russia and America in the nineteenth and twentieth centuries.

The belief in a "twin" world, Terra, is widespread on Antiterra as a sort of fringe religion or mass hallucination. (The name "Antiterra" may be a back-formation from this; the planet is "really" called "Demonia".) One of Van's early specialties as a psychologist is researching and working with people who believe that they are somehow in contact with Terra. Terra's alleged history, so far as he states it, appears to be that of our world: that is, the characters in the novel dream, or hallucinate, about the real world.

The central characters are all members of the North American aristocracy, of mostly Russian and Irish descent. Dementiy ("Demon") Veen is first cousins with Daniel Veen. They marry a pair of twin sisters, Aqua and Marina, respectively, who are also their second cousins. Demon and Aqua raise a son, Ivan (Van); Dan and Marina two daughters, Ada and Lucette. The story begins when Van, aged 14, spends a summer with his cousins, then 12 and 8. A rough idea of the years covered by each section is provided in brackets, below, however the narrator's thoughts often stray outside of the periods noted.

Part 1: 43 chapters (1863–1888)
This part, which one critic called "the last 19th-century Russian novel", takes up nearly half the book. Throughout this part of the novel, the many passages depicting the blossoming of Van and Ada's love vary in rhythm, style and vocabulary—ranging from lustrous, deceptively simple yet richly sensual prose to leering and Baroque satire of eighteenth-century pornography—depending on the mood Nabokov wishes to convey.

The first four chapters provide a sort of unofficial prologue, in that they move swiftly back and forth through the chronology of the narrative, but mostly deal with events between 1863 and 1884, when the main thrust of the story commences. They depict Van and Ada discovering their true relationship, Demon and Marina's tempestuous affair, Marina's sister Aqua's descent into madness and obsession with Terra and water, and Van's "first love", a girl he sees in an antique shop but never speaks to. Chapters 4 to 43 mostly deal with Van's adolescence, and his first meetings with his "cousin" Ada—focused on the two summers when he joins her (and her "sister" Lucette) at Ardis Hall, their ancestral home, in 1884 and 1888.

In 1884 Van and Ada, age 14 and 12, fall passionately in love, and their affair is marked by a powerful sense of romantic eroticism. The book opens with their discovery that they are in fact not cousins but brother and sister. The passage is notoriously difficult, more so as neither of them explicitly states the conclusion they have drawn (treating it as obvious), and it is only referred to in passing later in the text. Although Ada's mother keeps a wedding photo dated August 1871, eleven months before her birth, they find in a box in the attic a newspaper announcement dating the wedding to December 1871; and furthermore that Dan had been abroad since that spring, as proved by his extensive filmreels. Hence he is not Ada's father. Furthermore, they find an annotated flower album kept by Marina in 1869–70 which indicates, very obliquely, that she was pregnant and confined to a sanatorium at the same time as Aqua; that 99 orchids were delivered to Marina, from Demon, on Van's birthday; and that Aqua had a miscarriage in a skiing accident. It later transpires that Marina gave the child to her sister to replace the one she had lost—so she is in fact Van's mother—and that her affair with Demon continued until Ada's conception. This makes Lucette (Dan and Marina's child) the uterine half-sister of both of them.

Van returns to Ardis for a second visit in the summer of 1888. The affair has become strained because of Van's suspicions that Ada has had another lover and the increasing intrusion of Lucette (their now-12-year-old half-sister) into their trysts (an intrusion that Van half-welcomes with conflicted feelings). This section ends with Van's discovery that Ada has in fact been unfaithful, and his flight from Ardis to exact revenge upon those "rivals" of whom he is aware: Phillip Rack, Ada's older and weak-charactered music teacher; and Percy de Prey, a rather boorish neighbour. Van is distracted by a chance altercation with a soldier named Tapper, whom he challenges to a duel and by whom he is wounded.  In hospital he chances upon Phillip Rack, who is dying, and whom Van cannot bring himself to exact revenge upon. He then receives word that Percy de Prey has been shot and killed in Antiterra's version of the ongoing Crimean War.  Van moves to live with Cordula de Prey, Percy's cousin, in her Manhattan apartment, whilst he fully recovers. They have a shallow physical relationship, which provides Van with respite from the emotional strain of his feelings for Ada.

Part 2: 11 chapters (1888–1893)
Van spends his time developing his studies in psychology, and visiting a number of the "Villa Venus" upper-class brothels. In the autumn of 1892, Lucette, now having declared her love for Van, brings him a letter from Ada in which she announces she has received an offer of marriage from a wealthy Russian, Andrey Vinelander. Should Van wish to invite her to live with him she will refuse the marriage offer. Van does so, and they commence living together in an apartment Van has purchased from Ada's old school-friend, and Van's former lover, Cordula de Prey.

In February 1893, their father, Demon, arrives with news that his cousin (Ada's supposed father, but actual stepfather) Dan has died following a period of exposure caused by running naked into the woods near his home during a terrifying hallucinatory episode. Upon grasping the situation regarding Van and Ada, he tells Van that Ada would be happier if he "gave her up"—and that he would disown Van completely if he failed to do so. Van acquiesces, leaves, and attempts suicide, which fails when his gun fails to fire. He then leaves his Manhattan apartment and preoccupies himself with hunting down a former servant at Ardis, Kim Beauharnais, who had been blackmailing them with photographic evidence of their affair, and beating him with an alpenstock until he is blind.

Part 3: 8 chapters (1893–1922)
With Ada having married Andrey Vinelander, Van occupies himself in traveling and his studies until 1901, when Lucette reappears in England.  She has herself booked on the same transatlantic liner, the Admiral Tobakoff, that Van is taking back to America.  She attempts to seduce him on the crossing and nearly succeeds, but is foiled when Ada appears as an actress in the film, Don Juan's Last Fling, that they are watching together on the onboard cinema. Lucette consumes a number of sleeping pills and commits suicide by throwing herself from the Tobakoff into the Atlantic.
In March 1905, Demon dies in a plane crash.

Later in 1905, Ada and Andrey arrive in Switzerland. Van meets with them, and has an affair with Ada while pretending that they are engaged in uncovering Lucette's fortune, concealed in various hidden bank accounts. They formulate a plan for her to leave her husband and live with him. This is now considered possible due to the death of Demon. During their stay in Switzerland, however, Andrey falls ill with tuberculosis, and Ada decides that she cannot abandon him until he has recovered. Van and Ada part, and Andrey remains ill for 17 years, at which point he dies. Ada then flies back to Switzerland to meet with Van.

Part 4: Not subdivided (i.e. 1 chapter) (1922)
This part consists of Van's lecture on "The Texture of Time", apparently transcribed from his reading it into a tape recorder as he drives across Europe from the Adriatic to meet Ada in Mont Roux, Switzerland, while she is on her way from America via Geneva. The transcription has then been edited to merge into a description of his and Ada's actual meeting, and then out again. This makes this part of the novel notably self-reflexive, and it is sometimes cited as the "difficult" part of the novel, some reviewers even stating that they wished Nabokov had "left it out".  It could conversely be argued that it is one of the most potent evocations of one of the novel's central themes, the relation of personal experience of time to one's sense of being in and of the world. At the end of this section, Van and Ada are reunited and begin living together.

Part 5: 6 chapters (1922–1967)
This section of the novel is set in 1967, as Van completes his memoirs as laid out in Ada or Ardor: A Family Chronicle. He describes his contentment, such as it is, his relationship with his book, and the continuing presence and love of Ada. This is interspersed with remarks on pain and the ravages of time. Van and Ada have a conversation about death, and Van breaks off from correcting what he considers his essentially complete, but not yet fully polished, work. The book becomes increasingly distorted as Van and Ada merge into "Vaniada, Dava or Vada, Vanda and Anda".

Criticism and reception 
Critics dispute whether Van and Ada die by suicide at the end, as the author says "if our time-racked flat-lying couple ever intended to die".

David Potter describes Van's narrated world in the memoir as "an unstable blending of contradictions, jarring fantastical elements, and hallucinated temporalities" over which Van is only partially in control. He argues that this is what makes the novel so notoriously difficult to interpret.

Garth Risk Hallberg found the book challenging, but also acclaimed its prose and argued that Nabokov "manages a kind of Proustian magic trick: he recovers, through evocation, the very things whose losses he depicts."

David Auerbach felt that both Ada and its lead characters were alienating, and believed that Nabokov knew readers would find them so. He considered Van Veen to be an unreliable narrator and speculates that much of the story is Van's fantasy, comparing Antiterra to the expressly fictional settings Nabokov created in Invitation to a Beheading, Bend Sinister and Pale Fire.

See also

Tlön, Uqbar, Orbis Tertius by Jorge Luis Borges
René, Atala, Romance à Hélène and Mémoires d'Outre-Tombe by Chateaubriand
The Man in the High Castle (1962) by Philip K. Dick
The Ambidextrous Universe by Martin Gardner

Notes

Further reading
Cangogni, Annapaola (1995) Nabokov and Chateaubriand, in Vladimir E. Alexandrov (1995) The Garland Companion to Vladimir Nabokov
"Vladimir Nabokov, Science Fiction Writer" by Ted Gioia (Conceptual Fiction)

External links

AdaOnline "combines the text of Vladimir Nabokov's longest and richest novel, in one frame, and in another, annotations and fore- and afternotes to each chapter, hyperlinked to each other and to a third frame incorporating supplementary materials, especially pictorial illustrations and a list of verbal and thematic motifs in the novel".
 
Bridges to Antiterra is an attempt at cataloguing and providing, when available, public-domain internet versions of the numerous texts to which Nabokov alluded in Ada.
A Timeline of Ada
The Geography of Antiterra
"Vladimir Nabokov, Science Fiction Writer" by Ted Gioia (Conceptual Fiction)"

1969 American novels
1969 science fiction novels
American alternate history novels
Novels by Vladimir Nabokov
Incest in fiction
Postmodern novels
McGraw-Hill books